First Lieutenant Jacob Koogle (December 5, 1841 – March 16, 1915) was an American soldier who fought in the American Civil War. Koogle received his country's highest award for bravery during combat, the Medal of Honor. Koogle's medal was won for capturing the flag at the Battle of Five Forks in Virginia on April 1, 1865. He was honored with the award on May 10, 1865.

Koogle was born in Frederick, Maryland, and was buried in Myersville, Maryland.

Medal of Honor citation

See also
List of American Civil War Medal of Honor recipients: G–L

References

External links 
 

1841 births
1915 deaths
American Civil War recipients of the Medal of Honor
People of Maryland in the American Civil War
Union Army officers
United States Army Medal of Honor recipients